Stigmatophora tridens is a moth in the subfamily Arctiinae. It was described by Wileman in 1910. It is found in Taiwan.

References

Natural History Museum Lepidoptera generic names catalog

Moths described in 1910
Lithosiini
Moths of Taiwan